The 1992 Summer Olympics medal table is a list of National Olympic Committees and two non-NOC teams ranked by the number of medals won during the 1992 Summer Olympics, held in Barcelona, Catalonia, Spain, from July 25 to August 9, 1992. A total of 9,356 athletes from 169 countries participated in these games, competing in 257 events in 28 sports.

Athletes from 64 countries won at least one medal, leaving 105 countries without a medal. The Unified Team (ex-USSR countries that competed together because the Soviet Union broke up several months before the start of the Games) won the most medals overall, 112, as well as the most gold medals, 45, edging the United States team that won 108 total and 37 gold medals respectively. As of 2021, these are the last Summer Olympics where the United States did not win the most medals overall, and the only one since 1936 where the most gold medals were not won by either the USA, the USSR, or China. Host nation Spain finished the games with 22 medals overall (thirteen gold, seven silver, and two bronze). South Africa competed in the Olympics for the first time since 1960 due to the fall of apartheid. Latvia and Estonia competed as independent countries for the first time since 1936, and Lithuania competed independently for the first time since 1928. During the Cold War they were occupied by the Soviet Union. Croatia, Bosnia-Herzegovina, and Slovenia competed independently (as opposed to as a part of Yugoslavia) for the first time.

Medal table

The ranking in this table is based on information provided by the International Olympic Committee. The ranking sorts by the number of gold medals earned by a country (in this context a country is an entity represented by a National Olympic Committee). The number of silver medals is taken into consideration next and then the number of bronze medals. If, after the above, countries are still tied, equal ranking is given and they are listed alphabetically.

Key

Medal changes

References

External links
 
 
 

Medal count
Summer Olympics medal tables